The Men's 1993 World Amateur Boxing Championships were held in Tampere, Finland from May 7 to 16. The seventh edition of this competition, held nearly a year after the Summer Olympics in Barcelona, Spain, was organised by the Tampere Boxing Association, member of the Finnish Boxing Association under the influence of the world's governing body for amateur boxing AIBA. The 1993 World Championships witnessed the introduction of publicised scores at the end of each round.

Medal table

Medal winners

External links 
 Results on Amateur Boxing

World Amateur Boxing Championships
AIBA World Boxing Championships
B
World Amateur Boxing Championships, 1993
Sports competitions in Tampere
May 1993 sports events in Europe